The green oriole or Australasian yellow oriole (Oriolus flavocinctus) is an inconspicuous inhabitant of lush tropical vegetation throughout Australia and New Guinea.

Taxonomy and systematics
Alternate names for the green oriole include the Australian yellow oriole, yellow oriole and yellow-bellied oriole.

Subspecies
Six subspecies are recognized: 
 O. f. migrator - Hartert, 1904: Found in eastern Lesser Sundas
 O. f. muelleri - (Bonaparte, 1850): Originally described as a separate species. Found in south-central New Guinea
 O. f. flavocinctus - (King, P.P., 1826): Found in northern Australia
 O. f. tiwi - Schodde & Mason, IJ, 1999: Found on Bathurst and Melville Islands (off northern Australia)
 O. f. flavotinctus - Schodde & Mason, IJ, 1999: Found on Cape York Peninsula (north-eastern  Australia)
 O. f. kingi - Mathews, 1912: Found in north-eastern Queensland (north-eastern Australia)

Distribution and habitat
They are often difficult to locate, as their yellow-green plumage blends with the foliage and only their deep bubbling musical calls can be heard. They are nevertheless common in suitable habitat: rainforests, mangroves, thickets along watercourses, swamps, and lush gardens.

Behaviour and ecology

Breeding
Breeding takes place during the wet season (October to March). A neat, deep cup is constructed from strips of bark and vines, lined with rootlets, and slung between leafy branches, usually  5-15 m up. They typically lay two eggs.

Food and feeding
Green orioles forage slowly and methodically through the middle and upper strata of dense forests, taking fruit in the main. Typically alone or in pairs, they sometimes form small flocks in the nonbreeding season.

References

green oriole
green oriole
Birds of the Aru Islands
Birds of New Guinea
Birds of the Northern Territory
Birds of Cape York Peninsula
green oriole
green oriole